Alate (Latin ālātus, from āla (“wing”)) is an adjective and noun used in entomology and botany to refer to something that has wings or winglike structures.

In entomology

In entomology, "alate" usually refers to the winged form of a social insect, especially ants or termites, though can also be applied to aphids and some thrips. An alate is a winged reproductive caste from a social insect colony in its winged form. 

Alate females are typically those destined to become gynes (queens), whereas alate males are occasionally referred to as "drones" (or "kings", in the case of termites).  Their common behavioural function is starting a new colony, to expand their mother colonies etc. Colonies of termites and ants produce alates. It is a flight-based form of reproductive technique. In a termite colony, alates (winged males and winged females) disperse in a specific period or a month. Male and female pair to each other during flight, shed their wings, and start a new colony.   

The existence of reproductives that do not have wings (e.g., ergatoid queens and gamergates) necessitates a term to distinguish the winged from the wingless reproductive forms. This is an example of polymorphism associated with eusociality. A "dealate" is an adult insect that shed or lost its wings ("dealation").

In botany

In botany "alate" refers to winglike structures on some seeds that use wind dispersal. It is also used to describe flattened ridges which run longtitudianally on stems.

References

External links
 

Insect ecology
Insect reproduction
Animal flight